Geggy Tah is a band initially composed of writer/singer Tommy Jordan and keyboard/guitarist Greg Kurstin.  Each of them has a younger sister who was unable to pronounce her brother's name when very young; "Geggy" and "Tah" were the baby girls' mispronunciations of their brothers' names.

Their first release, Grand Opening, appeared in 1994 on David Byrne's label Luaka Bop.  For their 1996 release Sacred Cow, they added drummer Daren Hahn to the lineup.  Also on Luaka Bop, the album spawned the hit single "Whoever You Are" which peaked at #16 on the Billboard Modern Rock Tracks chart (the song would also appear in a Mercedes-Benz commercial circa 2001). Both albums were produced by Susan Rogers whose credits also include Prince, The Jacksons, David Byrne, Barenaked Ladies and Edie Brickell, and featured Rogers's dog, Gina, on their covers.

In 1999, the band announced a new album entitled Music Inspired by the Fragrance, and released two songs ("Space Heater" and "Sweat") on the web in mp3 format.  However, in part because of Luaka Bop's move from Warner Bros. to Virgin Records, the album went unreleased until 2001, by which point it had acquired a new title: Into the Oh. Into the Oh was released on Luaka Bop  / Virgin with new band members including Los Angeles session percussionist and composer "Lavey" Bruce Millstein.

In 2000, Tommy Jordan played the steel drums track for Jack Johnson's song "Flake" on Brushfire Fairytales.

In 2006, Kurstin formed a new band, The Bird and the Bee.  In 2010, Kurstin was nominated for a Grammy Award in the Best Producer, Non-Classical division for his work on Lily Allen's It's Not Me, It's You.

Discography

Albums
 Grand Opening (1994, Luaka Bop)
 Sacred Cow (1996, Luaka Bop)
 Into the Oh (2001, Luaka Bop/Virgin)

Singles

References

External links

Geggy Tah on Myspace

Alternative rock groups from California
Luaka Bop artists
Musical groups from Los Angeles
Musical groups established in 1994
1994 establishments in California